The Isaac Bell House is a historic house and National Historic Landmark at 70 Perry Street (at the corner with Bellevue Avenue) in Newport, Rhode Island.  Also known as Edna Villa, it is one of the outstanding examples of Shingle Style architecture in the United States. It was designed by McKim, Mead, and White, and built during the Gilded Age, when Newport was the summer resort of choice for some of America's wealthiest families.

History

Isaac Bell Jr. was a successful cotton broker and investor, and the brother-in-law of James Gordon Bennett Jr., publisher of the New York Herald. Bell hired the New York architectural firm of McKim, Mead, and White (Charles Follen McKim, William R. Mead, and Stanford White) to design his summer cottage.  Known in Newport for designing Newport Casino, and later in Boston for designing Boston Public Library, they also designed Pennsylvania Station in New York City.  Construction took place between 1881 and 1883.

Shingle Style was pioneered by Henry Hobson Richardson in his design for the William Watts Sherman House, also in Newport. This style of Victorian architecture, featuring the extensive use of wooden shingles on the exterior, acquired some popularity in the late nineteenth century.  The Isaac Bell House exemplifies this through its unpainted wood shingles, simple window and trim detail, and multiple porches.  It combines elements of the English Arts and Crafts movement philosophy, colonial American detailing, and features a Japanese-inspired open floor plan and bamboo-style porch columns.  Interior features include inglenook fireplaces, natural rattan wall coverings, wall paneling and narrow-band wooden floors.

During its life, the house has variously been divided into apartments and served as a nursing home. With the help of Carol Chiles Ballard, the house was bought in 1994 by the Preservation Society of Newport County, which won awards for its restoration, and now operates it as a museum.

The Isaac Bell House was declared a National Historic Landmark in 1997.

See also
 
 List of National Historic Landmarks in Rhode Island
 National Register of Historic Places listings in Newport County, Rhode Island

References

External links

Isaac Bell House

2001 Victorian Society Award
Gilding and wallpaper reproduction firm
Historic carpet reproduction firm

Images

Houses on the National Register of Historic Places in Rhode Island
Historic house museums in Rhode Island
Houses completed in 1883
Houses in Newport County, Rhode Island
McKim, Mead & White buildings
Museums in Newport, Rhode Island
National Historic Landmarks in Rhode Island
Shingle Style houses
Historic American Buildings Survey in Rhode Island
National Register of Historic Places in Newport, Rhode Island
Individually listed contributing properties to historic districts on the National Register in Rhode Island
Shingle Style architecture in Rhode Island